is a former Japanese football player.

Club career
Jojo was born in Hamura on August 28, 1977. After graduating from high school, he joined the Urawa Reds in 1996. In 1997, he played several matches as left side midfielder and left side back. However, he did not play as much in 2000. He moved to Albirex Niigata on loan in September 2002 and he returned to the Urawa Reds in 2003. However, he did not play much. He moved to Shonan Bellmare in 2004. He played often as left side back. He retired at the end of the 2006 season.

National team career
In June 1997, Jojo was selected by the Japan U-20 national team for the 1997 World Youth Championship. In that tournament, he played full-time in all five matches as left side midfielder and scored two goals.

Club statistics

References

External links

1977 births
Living people
People from Hamura, Tokyo
Association football people from Tokyo Metropolis
Japanese footballers
Japan youth international footballers
J1 League players
J2 League players
Urawa Red Diamonds players
Albirex Niigata players
Shonan Bellmare players
Association football defenders